Trigonogenius globulus, the globular spider beetle, is a species of spider beetle in the family Ptinidae. It is found in Africa, Australia, Europe and Northern Asia (excluding China), North America, and South America.

References

Further reading

External links

 

Bostrichoidea
Articles created by Qbugbot
Beetles described in 1849